Peterborough was a rural district adjoining the city and municipal borough of Peterborough, England, from 1894 to 1974. The council offices were at 51 Priestgate, in the city of Peterborough.

The rural district was created under the Local Government Act 1894, from the part of the Peterborough rural sanitary district that was in the administrative county of Soke of Peterborough (the rest, in Huntingdonshire, formed the Norman Cross Rural District).

In 1929 the city's boundaries were extended, with six of the rural district's parishes being absorbed.

Local government reorganisation abolished the Soke in 1965 and the rural district was transferred to the new administrative county of Huntingdon and Peterborough. The rural district was abolished under the Local Government Act 1972, becoming part of the Peterborough district of the new non-metropolitan county of Cambridgeshire.

Civil parishes

The rural district consisted of the following civil parishes:
Ailsworth
Borough Fen
Castor
Deeping Gate
Etton
Eye
Glinton
Gunthorpe (absorbed by the City of Peterborough in 1929)
Helpston
Longthorpe (created 1908 from part of Peterborough Without CP: absorbed by the City of Peterborough in 1929)
Marholm
Maxey
Newborough
Northborough
Paston (absorbed by the City of Peterborough in 1929)
Peakirk
Peterborough Without (absorbed by the City of Peterborough in 1929)
Sutton
Upton
Walton (absorbed by the City of Peterborough in 1929)
Werrington (absorbed by the City of Peterborough in 1929)

See also
Barnack Rural District
Local government in Peterborough

References

External links
A vision of Britain through time

History of Peterborough
Politics of Peterborough
Districts of England created by the Local Government Act 1894
Districts of England abolished by the Local Government Act 1972
Rural districts of England